In computational complexity theory, the Sipser–Lautemann theorem or Sipser–Gács–Lautemann theorem states that bounded-error probabilistic polynomial (BPP) time is contained in the polynomial time hierarchy, and more specifically Σ2 ∩ Π2.

In 1983, Michael Sipser showed that BPP is contained in the polynomial time hierarchy. Péter Gács showed that BPP is actually contained in Σ2 ∩ Π2. Clemens Lautemann contributed by giving a simple proof of BPP’s membership in Σ2 ∩ Π2, also in 1983. It is conjectured that in fact BPP=P, which is a much stronger statement than the Sipser–Lautemann theorem.

Proof
Here we present the Lautemann's proof. Without loss of generality, a machine M ∈ BPP with error ≤ 2−|x| can be chosen.  (All BPP problems can be amplified to reduce the error probability exponentially.)  The basic idea of the proof is to define a Σ2 sentence that is equivalent to stating that x is in the language, L, defined by M by using a set of transforms of the random variable inputs.

Since the output of M depends on random input, as well as the input x, it is useful to define which random strings produce the correct output as A(x) = {r | M(x,r) accepts}.  The key to the proof is to note that when x ∈ L, A(x) is very large and when x ∉ L, A(x) is very small.  By using bitwise parity, ⊕, a set of transforms can be defined as A(x) ⊕ t={r ⊕ t | r ∈ A(x)}.  The first main lemma of the proof shows that the union of a small finite number of these transforms will contain the entire space of random input strings.  Using this fact, a Σ2 sentence and a Π2 sentence can be generated that is true if and only if x ∈ L (see conclusion).

Lemma 1
The general idea of lemma one is to prove that if A(x) covers a large part of the random space  then there exists a small set of translations that will cover the entire random space.  In more mathematical language:

If , then , where  such that 

Proof. Randomly pick t1, t2, ..., t|r|. Let  (the union of all transforms of A(x)).

So, for all r in R,

The probability that there will exist at least one element in R not in S is

Therefore

Thus there is a selection for each  such that

Lemma 2
The previous lemma shows that A(x) can cover every possible point in the space using a small set of translations. We have:

Conclusion
The lemmas show that language membership of a language in BPP can be expressed as a Σ2 expression, as follows.

That is, x is in language L if and only if there exist  binary vectors, where for all random bit vectors r, TM M accepts at least one random vector ⊕ ti.

The above expression is in Σ2 in that it is first existentially then universally quantified.  Therefore BPP ⊆ Σ2.  Because BPP is closed under complement, this proves BPP ⊆ Σ2 ∩ Π2.

Stronger version 

References 

Structural complexity theory
Randomized algorithms
Theorems in computational complexity theory
Articles containing proofs